Alireza Samimi (born 29 June 1987) is an Iranian professional futsal player. He is a Goalkeeper, and currently a member of Mes Sungun and the Iran national futsal team.

He was among the top ten goalkeepers in the world in 2018, 2017 and 2016, according to the list published by the Futsal Planet website.

Honours

Country 
 FIFA Futsal World Cup
 Third place (1): 2016
 AFC Futsal Championship
 Champion (2): 2016 - 2018
 Runners-up (1): 2014
 Asian Indoor and Martial Arts Games
 Champion (3): 2009 - 2013 - 2017
 Grand Prix
 Runner-Up (1): 2015

Club 
 AFC Futsal Club Championship
 Champion (2): 2012 (Giti Pasand), 2018 (Mes Sungun)
 Runners-up (1): 2019 (Mes Sungun)
 Third place (1): 2014 (Dabiri)
 Iranian Futsal Super League
 Champion (3): 2017–18 (Mes Sungun), 2018–19 (Mes Sungun), 2019–20 (Mes Sungun)
 Runners-up (1): 2015–16 (Mes Sungun)

Individual 
Best goalkeeper:
Iranian Futsal Super League (2): 2013–14 (Melli Haffari) - 2017–18 (Mes Sungun)
UMBRO Futsal Awards
10 Best Goalkeepers of the World (3): 2018 (7th), 2017 (7th), 2016 (7th)

References

External links 
 
Alireza Samimi on Instagram
Alireza Samimi on Facebook

1987 births
Living people
People from Bushehr
Iranian men's futsal players
Futsal goalkeepers
Elmo Adab FSC players
Sadra Shiraz FSC players
Melli Haffari FSC players
Giti Pasand FSC players
Dabiri FSC players
Mes Sungun FSC players